Matt Reid was the defending champion, but lost in the first round to Radu Albot.
Chung Hyeon won the title, defeating Alex Bolt in final, 6–2, 7–5.

Seeds

Draw

Finals

Top half

Bottom half

References
 Main Draw
 Qualifying Draw

McDonald's Burnie International - Singles
2015 Singles
2015 in Australian tennis